Prince Jan Franciszek Czartoryski or Blessed Michał (19 February 1897–6 September 1944) was a Polish noble, and a Dominican friar.

John Czartoryski was born in Pelkinie (Jaroslaw) on 19 February 1897. He was an activist of the young organisation "Odrodzenie" ("Rebirth") in Lwów. During the Warsaw Uprising he was the chaplain of the Armia Krajowa Group "Konrad", and was shot by German troops.

Czartoryski was beatified on 13 June 1998 among the 108 Polish Martyrs of World War II.

Feast Day is 6 September.

References

External links
 Czartoryski Jerzy at czartoryski.fm.interia.pl

1897 births
1944 deaths
108 Blessed Polish Martyrs
Jan Franciszek
Polish Dominicans
20th-century venerated Christians
Polish military chaplains
World War II chaplains
Catholic saints and blesseds of the Nazi era
Polish civilians killed in World War II
Home Army officers
Warsaw Uprising insurgents
Resistance members killed by Nazi Germany
Polish people executed by Nazi Germany
People executed by Nazi Germany by firing squad